Kalmia latifolia, the mountain laurel, calico-bush, or spoonwood, is a species of flowering plant in the heath family Ericaceae, that is native to the eastern United States. Its range stretches from southern Maine south to northern Florida, and west to Indiana and Louisiana. Mountain laurel is the state flower of Connecticut and Pennsylvania. It is the namesake of Laurel County in Kentucky, the city of Laurel, Mississippi, and the Laurel Highlands in southwestern Pennsylvania.

Description
The leaves are 3–12 cm long and 1–4 cm wide. The flowers are hexagonal, sometimes appearing to be pentagonal, ranging from light pink to white, and occur in clusters. There are several named cultivars that have darker shades of pink, red and maroon. It blooms in May and June. All parts of the plant are poisonous. The roots are fibrous and matted.

Distribution and habitat
The plant is naturally found on rocky slopes and mountainous forest areas. It thrives in acid soil, preferring a soil pH in the 4.5 to 5.5 range. The plant often grows in large thickets, covering great areas of forest floor. In the Appalachians, it can become a tree but is a shrub farther north. The species is a frequent component of oak-heath forests. In low, wet areas it grows densely, but in dry uplands has a more sparse form. In the southern Appalachians, laurel thickets are referred to as "laurel hells" because it is nearly impossible to pass through one.

Ecology
Kalmia latifolia has been marked as a pollinator plant, supporting and attracting butterflies and hummingbirds.

It is also notable for its unusual method of dispensing its pollen. As the flower grows, the filaments of its stamens are bent and brought into tension. When an insect lands on the flower, the tension is released, catapulting the pollen forcefully onto the insect. Experiments have shown the flower capable of flinging its pollen up to 15 cm. Physicist Lyman J. Briggs became fascinated with this phenomenon in the 1950s after his retirement from the National Bureau of Standards and conducted a series of experiments in order to explain it.

Etymology
Kalmia latifolia is also known as ivybush or spoonwood (because Native Americans used to make their spoons out of it).

The plant was first recorded in America in 1624, but it was named after the Finnish explorer and botanist Pehr Kalm (1716–1779), who sent samples to Linnaeus.

The Latin specific epithet latifolia means "with broad leaves" – as opposed to its sister species Kalmia angustifolia, "with narrow leaves".

Despite the name "mountain laurel", Kalmia latifolia is not closely related to the true laurels of the family Lauraceae.

Cultivation

The plant was originally brought to Europe as an ornamental plant during the 18th century. It is still widely grown for its attractive flowers and year-round evergreen leaves. Elliptic, alternate, leathery, glossy evergreen leaves (to 5" long) are dark green above and yellow green beneath and reminiscent of the leaves of rhododendrons. All parts of this plant are toxic if ingested. Numerous cultivars have been selected with varying flower color. Many of the cultivars have originated from the Connecticut Experiment Station in Hamden and from the plant breeding of Dr. Richard Jaynes. Jaynes has numerous named varieties that he has created and is considered the world's authority on Kalmia latifolia.

In the UK the following cultivars have gained the Royal Horticultural Society's Award of Garden Merit:
'Freckles' – pale pink flowers, heavily spotted
'Little Linda' – dwarf cultivar to  
'Olympic Fire' – red buds opening pale pink
'Pink Charm'

Wood

The wood of the mountain laurel is heavy and strong but brittle, with a close, straight grain. It has never been a viable commercial crop as it does not grow large enough, yet it is suitable for wreaths, furniture, bowls and other household items. It was used in the early 19th century in wooden-works clocks. Root burls were used for pipe bowls in place of imported briar burls unattainable during World War II. It can be used for handrails or guard rails.

Toxicity
Mountain laurel is poisonous to several animals, including horses, goats, cattle,  deer, monkeys, and humans, due to grayanotoxin and arbutin. The green parts of the plant, flowers, twigs, and pollen are all toxic, including food products made from them, such as toxic honey that may produce neurotoxic and gastrointestinal symptoms in humans eating more than a modest amount. Symptoms of toxicity begin to appear about 6 hours following ingestion. Symptoms include irregular or difficulty breathing, anorexia, repeated swallowing, profuse salivation, watering of the eyes and nose, cardiac distress, incoordination, depression, vomiting, frequent defecation, weakness, convulsions, paralysis, coma, and eventually death. Necropsy of animals who have died from spoonwood poisoning show gastrointestinal hemorrhage.

Use by Native Americans
The Cherokee use the plant as an analgesic, placing an infusion of leaves on scratches made over location of the pain. They also rub the bristly edges of ten to twelve leaves over the skin for rheumatism, crush the leaves to rub brier scratches, use an infusion as a wash "to get rid of pests", use a compound as a liniment, rub leaf ooze into the scratched skin of ball players to prevent cramps, and use a leaf salve for healing. They also use the wood for carving.

Gallery

References

External links
Connecticut Botanical Society Profile: Kalmia latifolia
Kalmia latifolia images at bioimages.vanderbilt.edu

latifolia
Flora of the Appalachian Mountains
Trees of the Northeastern United States
Trees of the Southeastern United States
Trees of the Great Lakes region (North America)
Natural history of the Great Smoky Mountains
Plants used in traditional Native American medicine
Plants described in 1753
Taxa named by Carl Linnaeus
Symbols of Connecticut
Symbols of Pennsylvania
Garden plants of North America
Poisonous plants